Vltavou refers to the river Vltava, in the Czech Republic. It may also refer to:


Places in the Czech Republic
Albrechtice nad Vltavou, a village in Písek District, South Bohemian Region
Boršov nad Vltavou, a village in České Budějovice District, South Bohemian Region
Hluboká nad Vltavou, a town in České Budějovice District, South Bohemian Region
Kamýk nad Vltavou, a village in Příbram District, Central Bohemian Region
Kostelec nad Vltavou, a village in Písek District, South Bohemian Region
Kralupy nad Vltavou, a town in Mělník District, Central Bohemian Region
Krásná Hora nad Vltavou, a village in Příbram District, Central Bohemian Region
Libčice nad Vltavou, a town in Prague-West District, Central Bohemian Region
Lipno nad Vltavou, a village in Český Krumlov District, South Bohemian Region
Lužec nad Vltavou, a village in Mělník District, Central Bohemian Region
Orlík nad Vltavou, a village in Písek District, South Bohemian Region
Rožmberk nad Vltavou, a village in Český Krumlov District, South Bohemian Region
Týn nad Vltavou, a town in České Budějovice District, South Bohemian Region
Vrané nad Vltavou, a village in Prague-West District, Central Bohemian Region

Asteroids
14537 Týn nad Vltavou, named after Týn nad Vltavou
15960 Hluboká, named after Hluboká nad Vltavou

Football clubs
TJ Hluboká nad Vltavou, based in Hluboká nad Vltavou
FK Olympie Týn nad Vltavou, based in Týn nad Vltavou

Bridges
Viaduct Červená nad Vltavou, the highest rail viaduct in the Czech Republic